Breznik is a South Slavic place name that may refer to:

Bulgaria
Breznik, a town in western Bulgaria

Slovenia
Breznik, Črnomelj, a village in the Municipality of Črnomelj, southeastern Slovenia
Breznik, Zagorje ob Savi, a village in the Municipality of Zagorje ob Savi, central Slovenia